Chara is a surname. Notable people with the surname include:

Diego Chará (born 1986), Colombian footballer
Édison Chará (born 1980), Colombian footballer
Felipe Chara (born 1981), Colombian footballer
Ricardo Chará (born 1990), Colombian footballer
Yimmi Chará (born 1991), Colombian footballer
Zdeno Chára (born 1977), Slovak ice hockey player

See also

Char (name)
Charl (name)
Charla (name)
Charo (name)